The ancient Egyptian story of "King Neferkare and General Sasenet" survives only in fragments. With its atmosphere of nocturnal mystery and intrigue it is an early example of the literary cloak and dagger tradition. It is often cited by people interested in homosexuality and its history as being proof that a homosexual relationship existed between a pharaoh and one of his officers. On the other hand, literature often reflects social mores: the tale is censorious of the king's conduct which may well reflect the attitude of the people towards homosexuality. It purports to describe the nightly exploits of Pepi II Neferkare; some like R. S. Bianchi think that it is a work of archaizing literature and dates to the 25th Dynasty referring to Shabaka Neferkare, a Kushite pharaoh.

The story is dated to the late New Kingdom though it was composed earlier. Only three sources for it survive, each containing only a part of the overall narrative:
a wooden plaque, 18th or 19th Dynasty, now in the Oriental Institute of the University of Chicago
an ostrakon, 20th dynasty, from Deir el-Medina
the Papyrus Chassinat I, also known as Papyrus Louvre E 25351, 25th dynasty, now in the Louvre, Paris

It contains a reference to the ancient myth of the sun god Rê  and the god of the realm of the dead Osiris. These two gods existed in a relationship of interdependence: Osiris needing the light of the sun while Re, who had to cross the underworld during the night to reach the eastern horizon in the morning, needed the resurrective powers of Osiris. Their union took place during the four hours of deepest darkness – the same hours Neferkare is said to spend with his general.

References

Further reading
Jacobus van Dijk, The Nocturnal Wanderings of King Neferkare, in: Hommages Leclant. 4, 387–393
R.B. Parkinson, Voices from Ancient Egypt, Norman University of Oklahoma Press, 1991, p. 56ff.
Robert Steven Bianchi, Daily Life Of The Nubians, Greenwood Press 2004
R.B. Parkinson, The Tale of Sinuhe and Other Ancient Egyptian Poems, 1940–1640 BC, Oxford University Press 1999, pp. 289f.
Lynn Meskell, Private Life in New Kingdom Egypt, Princeton University Press 2001

External links
English translation

Ancient Egyptian fiction
Ancient LGBT people
Egyptian antiquities of the Louvre
Manuscripts of the Louvre
Pepi II Neferkare
Same-sex couples